Nic & the Family is a Swedish pop group formed in 2004 in Helsingborg. They are best known for their hit song Hej Hej Monika, from their only album Hej Hej Skiva.

Discography

Album

Singles

References

2004 establishments in Sweden
Musical groups established in 2004
Swedish pop music groups
Musical groups from Helsingborg